Brian Mac Con Midhe, Irish poet and writer, fl 1590s.

A son of Aonghus Mac Con Midhe, Brian was a member of an Irish brehon family, and chief poet to Turlough Luineach O'Neill.

See also

 Giolla Brighde Mac Con Midhe (fl. 1210?–1272?)
 Teige Mac Con Midhe
 Cormac Mac Con Midhe (d.1627)

References

 Glimpses of Gaelic Ireland,, 33–64, G. Murphy, Dublin, 1948.
 Lámhscríbhinní Gaeilge: Treoirliosta, Padraig de Brún, Dublin, 1988. 
 Tyrone's Gaelic Literary Legacy, by Diarmaid Ó Diobhlin, in Tyrone: History and Society, 403–432, ed. Charles Dillon and Henry A. Jefferies, Geography Publications, Dublin, 2000. .
 Medieval Ireland: An Encyclopedia, edited by Seán Duffy, Dublin, 2004.

External links
 https://web.archive.org/web/20110610141055/http://www.goireland.com/genealogy/family.htm?FamilyId=997

Irish-language poets
People from County Tyrone
16th-century Irish writers